My So-Called Life is a 1990s U.S. television series.

My So-Called Life may also refer to:

My So-Called Life (From Zero album), an album by From Zero
My So-Called Life (Venetian Snares album), an album by Venetian Snares